An oncogene is a gene that has the potential to cause cancer. In tumor cells, these genes are often mutated, or expressed at high levels.

Most normal cells will undergo a programmed form of rapid cell death (apoptosis) when critical functions are altered and malfunctioning. Activated oncogenes can cause those cells designated for apoptosis to survive and proliferate instead. Most oncogenes began as proto-oncogenes: normal genes involved in cell growth and proliferation or inhibition of apoptosis. If, through mutation, normal genes promoting cellular growth are up-regulated (gain-of-function mutation), they will predispose the cell to cancer; thus, they are termed "oncogenes". Usually multiple oncogenes, along with mutated apoptotic or tumor suppressor genes will all act in concert to cause cancer.  Since the 1970s, dozens of oncogenes have been identified in human cancer. Many cancer drugs target the proteins encoded by oncogenes.

History
The theory of oncogenes was foreshadowed by the German biologist Theodor Boveri in his 1914 book Zur Frage der Entstehung Maligner Tumoren (Concerning the Origin of Malignant Tumors) in which he predicted the existence of oncogenes (Teilungsfoerdernde Chromosomen) that become amplified (im permanenten Übergewicht) during tumor development.

Later on, the term "oncogene" was rediscovered in 1969 by National Cancer Institute scientists George Todaro and Robert Huebner.

The first confirmed oncogene was discovered in 1970 and was termed SRC (pronounced "sarc" as it is short for sarcoma). SRC was first discovered as an oncogene in a chicken retrovirus. Experiments performed by Dr. G. Steve Martin of the University of California, Berkeley demonstrated that SRC was indeed the gene of the virus that acted as an oncogene upon infection.  The first nucleotide sequence of v-Src was sequenced in 1980 by A.P. Czernilofsky et al.

In 1976, Drs. , J. Michael Bishop and Harold E. Varmus of the University of California, San Francisco demonstrated that oncogenes were activated proto-oncogenes as is found in many organisms, including humans. Bishop and Varmus were awarded the Nobel Prize in Physiology or Medicine in 1989 for their discovery of the cellular origin of retroviral oncogenes.

Dr. Robert Weinberg is credited with discovering the first identified human oncogene in a human bladder cancer cell line. The molecular nature of the mutation leading to oncogenesis was subsequently isolated and characterized by the Spanish biochemist Mariano Barbacid and published in Nature in 1982. Dr. Barbacid spent the following months extending his research, eventually discovering that the oncogene was a mutated allele of HRAS and characterizing its activation mechanism.

The resultant protein encoded by an oncogene is termed oncoprotein. Oncogenes play an important role in the regulation or synthesis of proteins linked to tumorigenic cell growth. Some oncoproteins are accepted and used as tumor markers.

Proto-oncogene 
A proto-oncogene is a normal gene that could become an oncogene due to mutations or increased expression. Proto-oncogenes code for proteins that help to regulate the cell growth and differentiation. Proto-oncogenes are often involved in signal transduction and execution of mitogenic signals, usually through their protein products. Upon acquiring an activating mutation, a proto-oncogene becomes a tumor-inducing agent, an oncogene. Examples of proto-oncogenes include RAS, WNT, MYC, ERK, and TRK. The MYC gene is implicated in Burkitt's lymphoma, which starts when a chromosomal translocation moves an enhancer sequence within the vicinity of the MYC gene. The MYC gene codes for widely used transcription factors. When the enhancer sequence is wrongly placed, these transcription factors are produced at much higher rates. Another example of an oncogene is the Bcr-Abl gene found on the Philadelphia chromosome, a piece of genetic material seen in Chronic Myelogenous Leukemia caused by the translocation of pieces from chromosomes 9 and 22. Bcr-Abl codes for a tyrosine kinase, which is constitutively active, leading to uncontrolled cell proliferation. (More information about the Philadelphia Chromosome below)

Activation 

The proto-oncogene can become an oncogene by a relatively small modification of its original function. There are three basic methods of activation:
A mutation within a proto-oncogene, or within a regulatory region (for example the promoter region), can cause a change in the protein structure, causing
 an increase in protein (enzyme) activity
 a loss of regulation
 An increase in the amount of a certain protein (protein concentration), caused by
 an increase of protein expression (through misregulation)
 an increase of protein (mRNA) stability, prolonging its existence and thus its activity in the cell
 gene duplication (one type of chromosome abnormality), resulting in an increased amount of protein in the cell
 A chromosomal translocation (another type of chromosome abnormality)
There are 2 different types of chromosomal translocations that can occur:
translocation events which relocate a proto-oncogene to a new chromosomal site that leads to higher expression
translocation events that lead to a fusion between a proto-oncogene and a 2nd gene (this creates a fusion protein with increased cancerous/oncogenic activity)
 the expression of a constitutively active hybrid protein. This type of mutation in a dividing stem cell in the bone marrow leads to adult leukemia
Philadelphia Chromosome is an example of this type of translocation event.  This chromosome was discovered in 1960 by Peter Nowell and David Hungerford, and it is a fusion of parts of DNA from chromosome 22 and chromosome 9. The broken end of chromosome 22 contains the "BCR" gene, which fuses with a fragment of chromosome 9 that contains the "ABL1" gene.  When these two chromosome fragments fuse the genes also fuse creating a new gene: "BCR-ABL".  This fused gene encodes for a protein that displays high protein tyrosine kinase activity (this activity is due to the "ABL1" half of the protein). The unregulated expression of this protein activates other proteins that are involved in cell cycle and cell division which can cause a cell to grow and divide uncontrollably (the cell becomes cancerous).  As a result, the Philadelphia Chromosome is associated with Chronic Myelogenous Leukemia (as mentioned before) as well as other forms of Leukemia.

The expression of oncogenes can be regulated by microRNAs (miRNAs), small RNAs 21-25 nucleotides in length that control gene expression by downregulating them. Mutations in such microRNAs (known as oncomirs) can lead to activation of oncogenes. Antisense messenger RNAs could theoretically be used to block the effects of oncogenes.

Classification
There are several systems for classifying oncogenes, but there is not yet a widely accepted standard. They are sometimes grouped both spatially (moving from outside the cell inwards) and chronologically (parallelling the "normal" process of signal transduction). There are several categories that are commonly used:

Additional oncogenetic regulator properties include:
Growth factors are usually secreted by either specialized or non-specialized cells to induce cell proliferation in themselves, nearby cells, or distant cells. An oncogene may cause a cell to secrete growth factors even though it does not normally do so. It will thereby induce its own uncontrolled proliferation (autocrine loop), and proliferation of neighboring cells, possibly leading to tumor formation. It may also cause production of growth hormones in other parts of the body.
Receptor tyrosine kinases add phosphate groups to other proteins in order to turn them on or off. Receptor kinases add phosphate groups to receptor proteins at the surface of the cell (which receives protein signals from outside the cell and transmits them to the inside of the cell). Tyrosine kinases add phosphate groups to the amino acid tyrosine in the target protein. They can cause cancer by turning the receptor permanently on (constitutively), even without signals from outside the cell.
Ras is a small GTPase that hydrolyses GTP into GDP and phosphate.  Ras is activated by growth factor signaling (i.e., EGF, TGFbeta) and acting as a binary switch (on/off) in growth signaling pathways.  Downstream effectors of Ras include three mitogen-activated protein kinases Raf a MAP Kinase Kinase Kinase (MAPKKK), MEK a MAP Kinase Kinase (MAPKK), and ERK a MAP Kinase(MAPK), which in turn regulate genes that mediate cell proliferation.

See also 
 Anticancer gene
 Oncogenomics
 Tumor suppressor gene
 Oncovirus
 Genetic predisposition
 Quantitative trait locus
 Genetic susceptibility
Oncometabolism

References

External links 

 Drosophila Oncogenes and Tumor Suppressors - The Interactive Fly

 
Carcinogenesis